Ēriks Rags (born 1 June 1975) is a Latvian javelin thrower. His personal best throw is 86.47 metres, achieved in July 2001 in London.  He has competed at three Summer Olympics between 2000 and 2008. He was born in Ventspils.

Achievements

Seasonal bests by year

1997 - 75.06
1998 - 80.56
1999 - 83.78
2000 - 83.61
2001 - 86.47
2002 - 86.44
2003 - 86.32
2004 - 85.83
2005 - 82.35
2006 - 85.99
2007 - 83.35
2008 - 85.05
2009 - 82.23
2010 - 82.05
2011 - 80.87
2012 - 76.49

References

External links
 
 
 

1975 births
Living people
Latvian male javelin throwers
Athletes (track and field) at the 2000 Summer Olympics
Athletes (track and field) at the 2004 Summer Olympics
Athletes (track and field) at the 2008 Summer Olympics
Olympic athletes of Latvia
Universiade medalists in athletics (track and field)
Goodwill Games medalists in athletics
People from Ventspils
Universiade gold medalists for Latvia
Medalists at the 1999 Summer Universiade
Medalists at the 2001 Summer Universiade
Competitors at the 2001 Goodwill Games